Utricularia odorata is a medium-sized, probably perennial carnivorous plant that belongs to the genus Utricularia. It is native to southeastern Asia (Cambodia, Laos, Thailand, and Vietnam) and northern Australia (Northern Territory). U. odorata grows as a terrestrial plant in wet grasslands at low altitudes. It was originally described by François Pellegrin in 1920. The specific epithet odorata is derived from reports that the flowers are fragrant.

See also 
 List of Utricularia species

References

External links
Utricularia odorata occurrence data from GBIF

odorata
Carnivorous plants of Asia
Carnivorous plants of Australia
Flora of Indo-China
Flora of the Northern Territory
Lamiales of Australia
Taxa named by François Pellegrin